Marie Oppert is a French singer and actress, born in 1997.

Biography 
Marie Oppert, daughter of musician parents, early starts the learning of the piano and the clarinet, and then during her childhood joins the choir of the College School of Paris (Conservatoire à rayonnement régional de Paris). She appears for the first time on stage in 2008 in the musical "Pinocchio's Journey" ("Le Voyage de Pinocchio") directed by Sandrine Anglade. In 2009, she plays Marta in the musical "The Sound of Music" ("La Mélodie du Bonheur") on the boards of the Théâtre du Châtelet ; for its 2011 repeat, she changes her part for Brigitta. Again in the Châtelet in 2013, she is the violinist of the British production of "Street Scene" from Kurt Weill. The very same year, she performs at the Salle Pleyel as "Mi Bémol" in "Le Clavier Fantastique", the children's opera of Graciane Finzi from Jules Verne.

Her career takes off in 2014, when she first plays the young Alice from Lewis Carroll in the show "Alice, la Comédie Musicale" directed by Marina Pangos, which then leads her to be Geneviève in "The Umbrellas of Cherbourg" from Jacques Demy and Michel Legrand at the Théâtre du Châtelet, together with Vincent Niclo, taking with success over the part crafted by Catherine Deneuve in 1964, in the movie from the same name.

Alongside her start in the acting profession, she succeeds in her exams of 2015 with the baccalaureate, and joins with enthusiasm the curriculum of the Marymount Manhattan College in New York City.

Musical theater 
 2008: Le Voyage de Pinocchio of Sandrine Anglade from Collodi, theater of Cachan
 2009: The Sound of Music from Richard Rodgers and Oscar Hammerstein II, Châtelet : Marta
 2011: The Sound of Music, Châtelet : Brigitta 
 2013: Street Scene from Kurt Weill, Châtelet : the violinist
 2013: Le Clavier fantastique from Graciane Finzi, salle Pleyel : Mi Bémol
 2014: Alice, la comédie musicale, from Julien Goetz and Marina Pangos, from Lewis Carroll, théâtre Clavel : Alice
 2014: Les Parapluies de Cherbourg from Jacques Demy and Michel Legrand : Geneviève

Theater 
 2018: The Idiot from Dostoievski, theater 14 Jean-Marie Serreau

References

External links 
 Maîtrise de Paris
 Biographie sur France Musique.fr
 Marie Oppert : tout d'une grande chanteuse sur NouvelObs.com
 Dans la loge de Marie Oppert, la révélation des Parapluies de Cherbourg sur France TV info.fr
 Marie Oppert and Natalie Dessay, Les Parapluies de Cherbourg, 2014
 

1997 births
Living people
French women singers
French actresses
21st-century French singers
21st-century French women